FWD  may refer to:

Businesses and organisations
 Far Western District of the Barbershop Harmony Society, an American music charity (founded 1946)
 Four Wheel Drive, an American vehicle manufacturer (1909–2003)
 FWD.us, an American lobby group (founded 2015)
 FWD Group, a Hong-Kong-based insurance multinational (founded 2013)

Technology
 Falling weight deflectometer, in civil engineering
 Fixed wireless data, in telecommunications 
 Four-wheel drive (often 4WD), of motor vehicles
 Free World Dialup, a voice over IP network
 Front-wheel drive, of motor vehicles

Television
 Fear the Walking Dead, a 2015 horror drama spin-off series

See also 
 Forward (disambiguation)